The Coffee Mill Hammock Formation is a geologic formation in Florida. The formation is about two-feet thick and is composed of shell marl. It sits on top of the Fort Thompson Formation and preserves fossils from the Late Pleistocene, predominantly Chione cancellata. It can be seen at Goodno's Landing, Fort Thompson, and at Coffee Mill Hammock, 12 north of LaBelle, Florida, in Glades County.

See also

 List of fossiliferous stratigraphic units in Florida

References

 
 National Geologic Map Database Geologic Unit: Coffee Mill Hammock
 Photograph of geologic layers at Goodno's Landing, Fort Thompson. The lowest level (D) is "Coffee Mill Hammock shell marl member of the Fort Thompson formation".

Geologic formations of Florida